Reginald John Tubby (1924 – 14 October 2015) was an Australian politician who was a Liberal Party member of the Legislative Assembly of Western Australia from 1975 to 1989, representing the seat of Greenough.

Tubby was born in Geraldton, Western Australia, to Constance Edith (née Jones) and John William Tubby. Tubby enlisted in the Royal Australian Air Force (RAAF) in January 1943, and served in the Northern Territory during the war. After his discharge in 1946, he returned to Gutha, taking over an abandoned farm. Becoming prominent in agricultural circles, Tubby was elected to the Morawa Roads Board (later the Shire of Morawa) in 1953, and would serve on the council until 1976, including nine years as shire president.

Tubby entered parliament at the 1975 Greenough by-election, which had been caused by the resignation of Sir David Brand, a former premier. He was re-elected at the 1977, 1980, 1983, and 1986 state elections, and served as deputy chairman of committees in the Legislative Assembly from 1980 to 1983. In his final term in parliament, he was joined by his son, Fred Tubby, who had been elected to the seat of Dale at a 1988 by-election. Tubby left parliament at the 1989 state election, and retired to Perth. He died there in October 2015, aged 91.

References

1924 births
2015 deaths
Liberal Party of Australia members of the Parliament of Western Australia
Mayors of places in Western Australia
Members of the Western Australian Legislative Assembly
People from Geraldton
Royal Australian Air Force personnel of World War II
Western Australian local councillors